The List of recipients of the Order of Polonia Restituta includes notable recipients of the Order of Polonia Restituta sorted by their profession.

Where possible it also lists their country of origin and order grade. People highly distinguished in more than one field have duplicate entries.

Art
Marian Konieczny — Polish sculptor
Władysław T. Benda — Polish-American artist
Olga Boznańska — Polish painter
Bohdan Butenko – Polish cartoonist
Countess Karolina Lanckorońska — Polish art historian and collector
Ryszard Horowitz — Polish-American photographer
Kazimierz Ostrowski — Polish painter (Officer's Cross)
Jerzy Zaruba — Polish graphic artist (Knight's Cross, Officer's Cross)
Adam Kossowski — Polish painter and muralist
Boleslaw Jan Czedekowski - Polish Portrait Painter

Business and economics
Grzegorz Kołodko — Finance Minister of Poland (Commander's Cross)
Edward Szczepanik — Polish economist and Prime Minister of the Polish Government in Exile (Knight's Cross)
Klemens Stefan Sielecki — Engineer and technical director of Fablok (Knight's Cross)
 Henry Hilary Chmielinski — President of the Hanover Bank and Trust (Boston, MA) and founder of the Polish Daily Courier (Boston, MA) (Knight's Cross)
Grzegorz Hajdarowicz — Polish entrepreneur, film producer, publisher (Knight's Cross)

Education
Benon Bromberek — Polish educator, Professor of Pedagogical Sciences (Knight's Cross) awarded 15 September 1977
Jakub Chlebowski — Polish medical educator
Władysław Dworaczek — Polish educator (Knight's Cross)
Wojciech Falkowski — Vice-Chancellor of the Polish University Abroad (PUNO) 2002-2011, Psychiatrist, and Painter (Officer's Cross)
Lili Pohlmann  – Holocaust survivor and educator (Commander's Cross)
Anna Radziwiłł — Polish educator, Minister of Education (Commander's Cross)
Michael Hewitt-Gleeson, Count de Saint-Arnaud — Australian scholar, (Officer's Cross)
Margaret Schlauch — American scholar, naturalised Polish (Officer's Cross)
Czesław Strumiłło — Polish scientist in the field of chemistry, founder of the theory of drying (Commander's Cross)
Kazimierz Lisiecki — Polish educator (Officer's Cross)
Anna Żarnowska – Polish historian (Officer's Cross)

Film
Józef Arkusz — Polish film director (Officer's Cross)
Sylwester Chęciński - Polish director (Grand Cross - posthumously, Commander's Cross with Star, Commander's Cross)
Bronisław Cieślak - Polish actor , politician and journalist
Anna Dymna - Polish actress (Commander's Cross)
Krystyna Feldman -Polish actress (Commander's Cross)
Piotr Fronczewski - Polish actor
Ignacy Gogolewski - Polish actor (Commander's Cross with Star)
Wiesław Gołas - Polish actor (Grand Cross - posthumously)
Jerzy Gruza - Polish director (Commander's Cross - posthumously)
Jerzy Hoffman - Polish director (Grand Cross)
Gustaw Holoubek — Polish actor (Knight's Cross, Commander's Cross with Star, Grand Cross)
Krystyna Janda - Polish actress (Commander's Cross with Star)
Kazimierz Kaczor - Polish aktor (Grand Cross)
Jerzy Kamas - Polish actor
Emil Karewicz - Polish actor (Commander's Cross - posthumously)
Jan Kobuszewski - Polish actor (Commander's Cross with Star)
Jan Kociniak - Polish actor
Krzysztof Kolberger - Polish actor (Commander's Cross - posthumously)
Maja Komorowska - Polish actress (Grand Cross, Commander's Cross)
Paweł Królikowski - Polish actor (Commander's Cross - posthumously)
Irena Kwiatkowska - Polish actress (Commander's Cross with Star)
Jan Machulski - Polish actor
Juliusz Machulski - Polish director
Zdzisław Maklakiewicz - Polish actor
Janusz Morgenstern - Polish director (Commander's Cross with Star)
Daniel Olbrychski - Polish actor (Commander's Cross)
Marian Opania - Polish actor
Franciszek Pieczka - Polish actor (Grand Cross, Commander's Cross with Star)
Wojciech Pszoniak - Polish actor (Commander's Cross)
Andrzej Seweryn - Polish actor (Commander's Cross)
Bohdan Smoleń - Polish actor
Jerzy Stuhr — Polish actor (Commander's Cross with Star)
Jerzy Trela - Polish actor (Commander's Cross with Star, Commander's Cross)
Andrzej Wajda - Polish director (Grand Cross)
Lidia Wysocka — Polish actress (Officer's Cross)
Krystyna Zachwatowicz — Polish actress and costume designer (Knight's Cross)
Stanisław Zaczyk — Polish actor
Janusz Zakrzeński - Polish actor (Commander's Cross - posthumously)
Krzysztof Zanussi - Polish director
Zbigniew Zapasiewicz - Polish actor (Grand Cross - posthumously)
Magdalena Zawadzka - Polish actress

Literature
Jerzy Andrzejewski — Polish author, Ashes and Diamonds (Commander's Cross)
Józef Białynia Chołodecki — Polish author and historian
Maria Dąbrowska — Polish writer novelist and journalist
Janusz Korczak — Polish Jewish author and educator
Mirosława Maria Kruszewska — Polish author, Polacy w Ameryce (Cavalier's Cross)
Stanisław Kutrzeba — Polish author and historian
Jan Józef Lipski — Polish author and historian (Grand Cross)
Richard C. Lukas — American author and historian
Józef Mackiewicz – Polish writer (Commander's Cross)
Hanna Ożogowska — Polish novelist and poet (Knight's Cross)
Robert Stiller — Polish translator
Piotr S. Wandycz — Polish American author and historian
Józef Weyssenhoff — Polish writer, novelist, poet, literary critic, publisher (Officer's Cross)
Adam Zagajewski - Polish poet
Jan Andrzej Zakrzewski — Polish journalist and writer
Andrzej Zaniewski — Polish writer, novelist, poet, songwriter (Officer's Cross)

Military
 Colonel Allen C. House, United States Army

Franciszek Alter — Polish general
Władysław Anders — commander of the Polish Armed Forces in the West (Commander's Cross)
Hamazasp Babadzhanian — Soviet-Armenian military commander
Tasker H. Bliss — American Chief of Staff of the US Army
Zygmunt Bohusz-Szyszko — Polish general (Officer's Cross)
Władysław Bortnowski — Polish general (Commander's Cross, Officer's Cross)
Omar Bradley — American General of the Army
Leonid Brezhnev — Marshal of the Soviet Union and Soviet politician (Grand Cross)
Edmund Charaszkiewicz — Polish military intelligence officer
Antoni Chruściel — commander of all Polish armed forces of the Warsaw Uprising (Grand Cross)
Victor Crutchley — British admiral
Hieronim Dekutowski — one of commanders of Wolnosc i Niezawislosc (Grand Cross)
John Dill — British Field Marshal
Bolesław Bronisław Duch — Polish general (Officer's Cross)
Dwight D. Eisenhower — President of the United States of America, Supreme Allied Commander (Chévalier-May 18, 1945)
Franciszek Gągor - Polish general (Grand Cross - posthumously)
Wanda Gertz — Polish resistance fighter
William Remsburg Grove — American Colonel, for relief efforts in 1919
Józef Haller de Hallenburg — Polish general (Commander's Cross)
William Holmes — British general (Commander's Cross with Star)
Wilm Hosenfeld — German officer (Commander's Cross)
Norman Hulbert — British officer
Ludwik Idzikowski — Polish aviator and pioneer (Officer's Cross)
Sergěj Ingr, Minister of National Defense in the Czechoslovak government-in-exile during the Protectorate of Bohemia and Moravia. (Grand Cross)
Wacław Jędrzejewicz — Polish soldier and diplomat (Grand Cross, Officer's Cross)
Wojciech Kania - Polish officer
Michał Karaszewicz-Tokarzewski — Polish general and resistance fighter (Commander's Cross, Officer's Cross)
Jan Karcz — Polish officer (Officer's Cross)
Deryck William Kingwell — Air Commodore of the RAAF(Royal Australian Air Force)
Adam Koc — Polish officer (Officer's Cross)
Piotr Konieczka, Polish soldier [posthumously]
Stanisław Kopański — Polish general (Grand Cross, Officer's Cross)
Franciszek Kornicki - Polish fighter pilot (Commander's Cross)
Józef Kowalski — Polish supercentenarian and second-to-last veteran from the Polish-Soviet war 1919-1921
Władysław Kozaczuk — Polish officer and historian (Knight's Cross)
Roman Krzyżelewski — Polish admiral (Commander's Cross, Officer's Cross, Knight's Cross)
Włodzimierz Kubala - Polish colonel, military attorney. (Commander's Cross)
Tadeusz Kutrzeba — Polish general (Commander's Cross, Knight's Cross)
Witold Łokuciewski — Polish fighter ace (Commander's Cross, Knight's Cross)
Douglas MacArthur — American Supreme Commander of the Allied Forces
Peyton C. March — US Army Chief of Staff
Wacław Micuta — participant in the Warsaw Uprising, UN diplomat (Commander's Cross with Star)
Joseph T. McNarney — American general (Commander's Cross with Star)
Martin Dunbar-Nasmith — British officer
Adam Nieniewski — Polish officer (Officer's Cross)
Mieczyslaw Oziewicz — RAF Warrant Officer (Commander's Cross) 
Jerzy Pajaczkowski-Dydynski — Polish officer
Earle E. Partridge — American general
Hubert Perring — British officer, for services to 303 Squadron
Sławomir Petelicki — Polish commander of GROM (Commander's Cross, Officer's Cross)
Witold Pilecki — Polish resistance fighter
Stanley George Culliford — New Zealand Pilot, for services during Operation Motyl.
Jadwiga Piłsudska — Polish aviator, daughter of Józef Piłsudski
Józef Piłsudski — Prime Minister of Poland, First Marshal, Chief of State
Jan Pirog Polish soldier 1st arm div. Knights cross
Ryszard Piotrowski — Polish Major, Armija Krajowa
Stanisław Popławski — Polish general (Grand Cross, Commander's Cross with Star, Commander's Cross)
Arthur John Power — British admiral
Alexander Pokryshkin - Soviet WWII ace pilot
Wacław Przeździecki — Polish officer (Commander's Cross)
Władysław Raginis — Polish officer (Grand Cross)
Stefan Rowecki — Polish general (Knight's Cross)
Wilhelm Orlik-Rueckemann — Polish general and military pioneer (Commander's Cross)
Edward Rydz-Śmigły — Marshal of Poland
Jan Rządkowski — Polish general
Danuta Siedzikówna — Polish nurse
Władysław Sikorski — general, Prime Minister of Poland, Prime Minister of the Polish Government in Exile
Jan Sobczyński — Polish painter and soldier
Stanisław Sosabowski — Polish general
Arthur Stanley-Clarke — British officer
Włodzimierz Steyer — Polish admiral (Commander's Cross, Officer's Cross)
Charles Pelot Summerall - American general, President of The Citadel (Grand Cordon)
Zygmunt Szendzielarz —  Polish commander of the 5th Vilnian Home Army Brigade (Grand Cross)
Stefan Sznuk — Polish general (Commander's Cross)
Henryk Szumski - Polish general
Antoni Szylling — Polish general
Carl Edelhjelm — Swedish officer
Josip Broz Tito — Marshal of Yugoslavia, Yugoslav politician (Grand Crosses) twice awarded 
Rodoljub Čolaković — Yugoslav partisan and politician
Tōgō Heihachirō - Japanese admiral
Władysław Wejtko — Polish general (Commander's Cross)
Harold Edward Whittingham - British Air Marshal (Commander's Cross with star)
Bolesław Wieniawa-Długoszowski — Polish general (Commander's Cross with star)
Ryszard Winowski - Polish colonel (Commander's Cross)
Stanislaw Robert Wlosok-Nawarski - Polish Air Force pilot during World War II
Józef Zając — Polish general
Mariusz Zaruski — Polish general (Grand Cross)
Czesław Zawilski — Polish corporal during World War II
Georgy Zhukov — Marshal of the Soviet Union and Soviet politician (Commander's Cross with Star)

Group Captain W.A.J. Satchell D.S.O Order of Polonia awarded 15 August 1953 for outstanding services to the Polish Air Force during World War Two.

Music

Ewa Bandrowska-Turska coloratura soprano and music educator (Officer's Cross)
Piotr Beczala − Polish tenor
Rafał Blechacz - Polish pianist
Ewa Demarczyk - Polish singer
Marek Grechuta - Polish singer
Jan Hoffman - Polish pianist and music educator (Officer and Commander's Cross with Star)
Maciej Jaskiewicz - Polish-Canadian Conductor
Wojciech Karolak — Polish musician (Knight's Cross)
Wojciech Kilar — Polish composer (Grand Cross)
Wladimir Jan Kochanski — Polish-American pianist
Maria Koterbska - Polish singer
Sławomir Kowalewski - Polish musician and singer
Krzysztof Krawczyk - Polish musician and singer
Marian Lichtman - Polish musician and singer
Zofia Lissa — Polish musicologist (Knight's Cross)
Jerzy Matuszkiewicz - Polish music composer
Wojciech Młynarski - Polish poet and singer
Włodzimierz Nahorny - Polish musician
Tadeusz Nalepa — Polish composer and guitarist
Jan Pietrzak - Polish singer
Jerzy Połomski - Polish singer
Andrzej Rozbicki - Polish conductor
Arthur Rubinstein — Polish-American Jewish pianist (Knight's Cross)
Tomasz Stańko - Polish jazzman
Władysław Szpilman — Polish-Jewish composer and pianist, protagonist of The Pianist
Robert Szreder - Polish violinist
Stanisław Wisłocki - Polish pianist and conductor
Zbigniew Wodecki - Polish musician , singer and composer
Krystian Zimerman - Polish pianist (Commander's Cross with Star)
Teresa Żylis-Gara - Polish opera singer

Politics

Władysław Bartoszewski — Minister of Foreign Affairs of the Republic of Poland (Commander's Cross with Star)
Edvard Beneš — Foreign Minister of Czechoslovakia, 1925.
Leonid Brezhnev — Marshal of the Soviet Union and Soviet politician (Grand Cross)
Krystyna Bochenek - Polish politician and journalist
Adam Bromke — Professor of International Affairs— Statesman (Grand Cross)3
Andrzej Butkiewicz — Political activist and co-founder of the Student Solidarity Committee (Knight's Cross)
Andrzej Byrt — Polish diplomat (Officer's Cross, Commander's Cross)
Andrzej Czuma — Minister of Justice of the Republic of Poland
Leszek Deptuła - Polish politician, member of the Sejm
Grzegorz Dolniak - Polish politician, member of the Sejm
Waldemar Dubaniowski — Polish diplomat, civil servant, secretary of state and Chief of the Cabinet of the President of Poland
Dwight D. Eisenhower — President of the United States of America, Supreme Allied Commander (Chévalier-May 18, 1945)
Osvaldo Dorticos — President of Cuba (Grand Cross), 1973.
Fidel Castro — Prime Minister of Cuba (Grand Cross), 1973.
Jolanta Fedak - Polish politician, member of the Sejm
Tadeusz Ferenc - Polish politician
Grażyna Gęsicka - Polish politician, member of the Sejm
Mieczysław Gil - Polish politician , member of the Sejm
Zyta Gilowska - Polish economist and politician
Przemysław Gosiewski - Polish politician, member of the Sejm
Bernard Hausner — Polish diplomat and member of the Sejm
Izabela Jaruga-Nowacka - Polish politician, member of the Sejm
Henryk Józewski — Polish artist and politician
Marek Jurek - Polish politician, member of the Sejm
Mariusz Kamiński — Polish politician, head of the Central Anticorruption Bureau (Commander's Cross)
Sebastian Karpiniuk - Polish politician
Teresa Klimek (1929-2013), co-founder of the local branch of the Catholic Intellectuals Club and executive on the regional branch of Solidarity (Knight's Cross)
 Leo Krzycki (1881-1966), Polish-American unionist and activist, awarded by Bolesław Bierut (1946)
Jan Kułakowski — Polish politician, member of the European Parliament (Commander's Cross with Star)
János Esterházy — most prominent ethnic Hungarian politician in former Czechoslovakia.
Andrzej Kern - Polish politician and lawyer, member of the Sejm
John Lesinski, Sr. — American congressman
Jan Lityński - Polish politician, member of the Sejm
Léon Noël (1888-1987), French ambassador and politician (Grand Cross).
Jan Nowak-Jeziorański — Polish resistance fighter and activist, Radio Free Europe
Piotr Nowina-Konopka — Polish politician (Officer's Cross)
Alvin E. O'Konski—American Member of Congress
Alvin M. Owsley — American politician
Andrzej Papierz — Polish diplomat
Józef Piłsudski — Prime Minister of Poland, First Marshal, Chief of State
Adam Piłsudski — Polish senator
Krzysztof Putra - Polish politician, member of the Sejm and a Senator
Marek Rocki — Polish economometrist and politician (Knight's Cross)
Jan Rulewski — Polish politician, activist of Solidarity; a Member of the Polish Sejm (1991-2001) and a Senator. (Commander's Cross)
Arkadiusz Rybicki - Polish politician, member of the Sejm
Ryszard Musielak — activist of Solidarity (Commander's Cross)
Józef Oleksy - Polish politician, member of the Sejm
Maciej Płażyński - Polish politician (Grand Cross - posthumously)
Michał Seweryński — Polish Minister of Science and Higher Education (Knight's Cross)
Władysław Sikorski — general, Prime Minister of Poland, Prime Minister of the Polish Government in Exile
Mário Soares — Prime Minister and President of Portugal
Władysław Stasiak - Polish senior official and politician
Edward Szczepanik — Polish economist and Prime Minister of the Polish Government in Exile (Knight's Cross)
Aleksander Szczygło - Polish politician , member of the Sejm
Jolanta Szczypińska - Polish politician, member of the Sejm
Jerzy Szmajdziński - Polish politician, member of the Sejm
Jolanta Szymanek-Deresz - Polish lawyer, politician, member of the Sejm
Adam Szostkiewicz - Polish author and journalist (Officer's Cross)
Josip Broz Tito — Marshal of Yugoslavia, Yugoslav politician (Grand Crosses) twice awarded
Lech Wałęsa — President of Poland, Nobel Peace Prize winner (Knight's Cross)
Zbigniew Wassermann - Polish politician, member of the Sejm
Wiesław Woda - Polish politician, member of the Sejm
Edward Wojtas - Polish politician, member of the Sejm
Henryk Wujec - Polish politician, member of the Sejm
Stanisław Zając - Polish politician and lawyer
Piotr Paweł Morta - Polish political activist, economist, activist in underground "Solidarity" (Officer's Cross)

Religion
Stanisław Dziwisz - Polish Catholic Cardinal (Grand Cross)
Edward Frankowski - Polish Catholic Bishop (Grand Cross)
Sławoj Leszek Głódź - Polish Catholic Archbishop
Andrzeja Górska — Polish nun (Commander's Cross)
Zenon Grocholewski - Polish Catholic Cardinal
Tadeusz Isakowicz-Zaleski — Polish priest
Marian Jaworski - Polish Catholic Cardinal
Ignacy Jeż — Polish Catholic Bishop
Michał Józefczyk — Polish priest
Józef Kowalczyk - Polish Archbishop (Grand Cross)
Adam Kozłowiecki - Polish Catholic Cardinal
Wojciech Lemański — Polish priest
Franciszek Macharski - Polish Catholic Cardinal (Grand Cross)
Henryk Muszyński - Polish Archbishop (Grand Cross)
Kazimierz Nycz - Polish Catholic Cardinal
Tadeusz Pieronek - Polish Bishop (Grand Cross)
Tadeusz Płoski - Polish Catholic Bishop
Wojciech Polak - Polish Catholic Archbishop
Lawrence Wnuk — Polish priest

Royalty
Adam Karol Czartoryski — Polish prince
Amha Selassie of Ethiopia — last emperor of Ethiopia
Haile Selassie I of Ethiopia — emperor of Ethiopia

Science and engineering

Ryszard Bartel — Polish aviation pioneer (Knight's Cross)
Gerard Ciołek — Polish architect and historian of parks and gardens (Knight's Cross)
Seweryn Chajtman — Polish scientist, engineer, teacher of the Industrial Management (Commander's Cross)
Jan Chodorowski — Polish materials science engineer (Officer's Cross)
Tadeusz Chyliński — Polish airplane constructor (Knight's Cross)
Ewa Damek – Polish mathematician (Knight's Cross)
Ryszard Jurkowski — Polish architect and urban planner (Officer's Cross)
Zbigniew Kabata — Polish parasitologist (Grand Cross)
Krzysztof Kazimierz Miller- Polish architect and urbanist (Knight's Cross)
Stanisław Mrozowski — Polish-American physicist
Jan Nagórski — Polish aviation pioneer
Marian Rejewski — Polish mathematician, breaker of the Enigma cipher (Grand Cross)
Tadeusz Sendzimir — Polish-American inventor (Officer's Cross)
Czesław Strumiłło — Professor of Chemical and Process Engineering (Commander's Cross)
Mirosław Vitali — Polish prosthetics pioneer
Kazimierz Żorawski — Polish mathematician (Commander's Cross)
Halina Leszczynska— Professor of Chemistry (Officer's Cross)
Czeslaw Olech — Polish mathematician (Commander's Cross)
Andrzej Chmielewski - Professor of Chemistry (Officer's Cross)
Marek Jan Sadowski - Professor of Physics (Officer's Cross)
Zdzisław Skupień  — Polish mathematician (Knight's Cross)
Roman Antoszewski - Polish plant physiologist (Knight's Cross)
Witold Abramowicz — Polish scientist, professor of economics (Knight's Cross)
Marcin Kacprzak - Polish  doctor, educator, pedagogue, publicist, pioneer of social medicine

Sport
Leo Beenhakker – Dutch football trainer — Poland national football team coach
Jakub Błaszczykowski - Polish football player
Zbigniew Boniek - Polish football player
Marek Cieślak – Polish speedway rider (Knight's Cross)
Czesław Cybulski - Polish athletics coach
Mariusz Czerkawski – Polish ice hockey player
Adela Dankowska – Polish glider pilot
Kazimierz Deyna - Polish football player
Małgorzata Dydek - Polish basketball player
Wojciech Fortuna - Polish ski jumper
Kazimierz Górski – Polish football coach (Grand Cross — posthumously; Commander's Cross with Star; Commander's Cross)
Wacław Kuźmicki – Polish decathlete (Knight's Cross)
Czesław Lang - Polish cyclist
Grzegorz Lato - Polish football player
Waldemar Legień – Polish judoka (Officer's Cross)
Robert Lewandowski – Polish football player (Commander's Cross)
Włodzimierz Lubański - Polish football player
Agata Mróz-Olszewska – Polish volleyball player (posthumously, not accepted by her husband)
Pelagia Majewska – Polish glider pilot
Adam Małysz – Polish ski jumper (Officer's Cross and Commander's Cross)
Natalia Partyka – Polish Table tennis player (Knight's Cross and Officer's Cross)
Katarzyna Rogowiec – Polish paralympian
Alfred Smoczyk – Polish speedway rider (Officer's Cross)
Włodzimierz Smolarek - Polish football player
Kamil Stoch - Polish ski jumper
Irena Szewińska - Polish athletic
Ryszard Szurkowski - Polish cyclist
Antoni Szymanowski - Polish football player
Tomasz Świątek – Polish rower  (Officer's Cross)
Denis Urubko – Russian-Polish alpinist
Bogdan Wenta – Polish handball player
Anita Włodarczyk - Polish athletic
Adam Wójcik - Polish basketball player

Other
Fernand Auberjonois — Swiss-American journalist
Irena Anders - Polish actress , widow of General Władysław Anders
Jerzy Bahr - Polish diplomat
Edmund Baranowski - Warsaw insurgent
Stanisław Bednarek - RAF aircraft engineer, "for his work dedicated to end the war and contribution to democracy" (2022)
Olga Drahonowska-Małkowska — founder of scouting in Poland
Jadwiga Falkowska — activist
Stefan Franczak (:pl:Stefan Franczak) — Jesuit monk, clematis breeder, Commander's Cross, 2009
Zbigniew Galperyn - Warsaw insurgent
Mirosław Hermaszewski — Polish cosmonaut, fighter plane pilot, and Polish Air Force officer (Commander's Cross)
Jerzy Jachowicz - Polish journalist
Anna Jakubowska - Warsaw insurgent
Karolina Kaczorowska - Widow of Ryszard Kaczorowski, the last President of the Republic of Poland in exile
Lucjan Kydryński (2006) — journalist and writer
Eugeniusz Lokajski - Warsaw insurgent
Franciszek Malinowski — journalist (Officer's Cross)
Jacek Maziarski - Polish journalist and politician
Marie Mattingly Meloney — U.S. journalist who raised $1 million to buy radium for Marie Curie's laboratory
Maciej Orłoś - Polish journalist
Simcha Rotem — fighter in the 1943 Warsaw Ghetto Uprising
Maciej Rybiński - Polish publicist
Irena Sendler —  Polish humanitarian who saved the lives of 2,500 Jewish children in the Warsaw Ghetto during World War II
Ryszard Siwiec — protester
Reinhold Smyczek —  Polish émigré activist, "for the work dedicated to independence and national treasure"
Włodzimierz Szaranowicz - Polish sport commentator
Zbigniew Ścibor-Rylski - Warsaw insurgent
Ludwika Wawrzyńska — hero (Commander's Cross)
Simon Wiesenthal — Austrian Jewish "Nazi-hunter"
Tadeusz Wrona — Pilot
Sugihara Chiune - Japanese vice consul in Lithuania during World War II
Foster Furcolo — American politician involved in international investigation of Katyn massacre
Anna Sabbat - Widów of Kazimierz Sabbat, President of the Republic of Poland in exile
Anna Stupnicka-Bando - Helped jews in World War 2 (2008)
Dariusz Szpakowski - Polish sport commentator
Eugeniusz Szyfner - Helped jews in World War 2 (2016)
Bohdan Tomaszewski - Polish sport commentator
Bogusław Wołoszański - Polish journalist

References